A magnum opus or masterpiece is the greatest work of a writer, artist, or composer. 

Magnum opus may also refer to:

Music
 Magnum Opus (Top Quality album), a 1993 hip-hop album
 Magnum Opus (Yngwie Malmsteen album), a 1995 guitar album
 "Magnum Opus", a song by Kansas from Leftoverture
 Magnum Opus, a 2014 album by Vaylon, mastered by Leæther Strip
 Magnum Opus Studios, a music studio opened in 1978 by American musician Randy Piper

Other uses
 Magnum opus (alchemy), the creation of the philosopher's stone
 Great Work, a practice, concept, or ritual in Hermeticism, Thelema, or occultism
 Megala Erga (Latin: Magna Opera), an ancient didactic poem attributed to Hesiod
 A vehicle in the 2015 video game Mad Max
 Magnum Opus, a 1998 Australian film
 "Magnum Opus", a two-part episode in the British TV series Lewis
 Magnum Opus, a character in the 1998 computer game Quest for Glory V: Dragon Fire
 Magnum Opus II (1996) and Magnum Opus II (1998), exhibitions by Israeli artist Oreet Ashery
 Magnum Opus, an online video series produced by Complex magazine
 Magnum Opus Broadcasting, a British company founded in 2004 by Richard Allinson and Steve Levine
 Magnum Opus Press, a game publishing company founded in 2007 by the James Wallis
 Magnum Opus: The Building of the Schoenstein Organ at the Conference Center of The Church of Jesus Christ of Latter-day Saints, a 2009 book by John Longhurst
 "Magnus Opus" (I Am Groot), a 2022 short film from the series I Am Groot

See also 
 Magnum Opus Con, a former multigenre convention in the U.S.
 Opus Magnum (album), a 2008 album by Hollenthon
 Opus Magnum, a 2017 video game by Zach Barth
 Magnum (disambiguation)
 Opus (disambiguation)